Garnsey is a surname. It may refer to:

Bruce H. Garnsey
Charles Frederick Garnsey (1828-1894), Anglican priest
Daniel G. Garnsey (1779–1851), American politician
David Garnsey (1909–1996), Australian bishop
George O. Garnsey (1840–1923), American architect
Peter Garnsey (born 1938), British historian

See also
Garnsey kill site, New Mexico, USA